Nishat Khan (born 25 October 1960) is an Indian sitar player from an illustrious musical family and the foremost sitar virtuoso of his generation.
As a composer and music producer he has collaborated with some of the world's leading musicians such as Paco Peña, John McLaughlin, Philip Glass and Evelyn Glennie. His sitar concerto "Gate of the Moon" premiered with the BBC National Orchestra for the Proms at Royal Albert Hall in 2013.

Early life
Khan was born in 1960 in Kolkata, India. He is the son of Imrat Khan and the nephew of Vilayat Khan, who come from the leading family of instrumental music in the North Indian classical tradition, the Etawah Gharana. With seven generations of sitar and surbahar (bass sitar) players, they directly influenced the evolution of sitar up to the present day. 
Nishat Khan started playing the sitar at the age of 3 and gave his first concert at the age of 7 in Kolkata. Riyaaz (practice) was rigorous, disciplined and enjoyable, often playing late into the night. He was always around music and there was no conversation without it, all his entertainment was centered on music. Nishat learned from his father and his guru, responsible for initiating his career, though his uncle Vilayat Khan was a great influence and inspiration for him.  He even skipped school to play sitar, and his father agreed to let him practice instead. Of course he attended a lot of concerts, as his family was always having visiting musicians and friends and when he returned home, an analysis of what he heard and “taalim” (training) would start.

Career
Khan's first international concert was in 1977 in London, when he performed with his father, Imrat Khan, at the Queen Elizabeth Hall with the eminent musicians of the subcontinent sitting together in the front row, Ravi Shankar, and Salamat Ali Khan. He established an international career touring extensively and collaborating with world-class artists such as John McLaughlin, Philip Glass, Paco Pena, Evelyn Glennie and Django Bates.

He first performed live in a duet with John McLaughlin in 1986 in Italy, who subsequently featured him on his 1993 album The Promise.  With Philip Glass, he performed a comparative piece with opera and Nishat's raga Germany in 1993.  In early 2000, Nishat began a unique collaboration with Paco Peña featuring Flamenco and sitar, with several tours in the UK and Europe as part of his group Spirit & Passion.  With Evelyn Glennie, he performed at two concerts – one with BBC Scottish Symphony, a special piece Khan composed called Dancing with Seagulls. This was also performed in London at Wigmore Hall. Khan has also composed and recorded sitar and vocals on the rock song Love is the Answer by Weezer in 2009.

Tours and performances
Nishat Khan has performed at major venues internationally, including Carnegie Hall, the Lincoln Center in New York, the Royal Albert Hall in London, and for Pope John Paul II at the Vatican. In 2004, he was invited to perform alongside Eric Clapton, Carlos Santana, Jeff Beck, John McLaughlin and others at the Crossroads Guitar Festival in Dallas. In 2007, he toured across India with violinist Vanessa Mae and performed at the Seagrams 100 Pipers Pure Music Show in August. In 2008, he toured Europe with his pioneering project, Spirit & Passion, featuring Flamenco guitar great Paco Pena, and later that year performed a solo concert at the BBC Proms. In 2009, he performed at Bovard Auditorium, Los Angeles. In October 2010, Nishat Khan worked on the concept of Mélange, a fusion-jazz show that features an eclectic mix of musicians from all around the world and performed at Tata Theatre, NCPA. He was also Invited to perform for the President of India at the Rashtrapati Bhavan.

The world premiere of Nishat Khan's Sitar Concerto no. 1 The Gate of the Moon featured as part of the BBC Proms programme at the Royal Albert Hall on 12 August 2013. The occasion was Khan's third appearance as a soloist at The Proms but was the first time showcasing one of his own orchestral compositions. The work integrates a sitar concerto with Western orchestration to tell the love story between the mystical "unknown traveller" (sitar) and the princess. David Atherton conducted the BBC National Orchestra of Wales in the performance of The Gate of the Moon, which was broadcast live on both BBC Radio 3 and the BBC Asian network. He gave the US premiere of the work in February 2018, with the Seattle Symphony.
In November that year, Nishat Khan held the audience in a spell as he indulged dance guru Pt Birju Maharaj in a duet or juggalbandi on stage at the opening of the 44th International Film Festival of India in Goa.

In 2015, he performed at the Théâtre de la Ville in Paris, the Kennedy Centre in Washington DC and at a concert at the Budapest Festival 2015. He has also collaborated with the artist-sculptor Anish Kapoor in London. In 2016, he visited Tehran with the Prime Minister's delegation and performed a solo concert at the Vahdat Hall. He also performed at the Barbican Hall in London the same year. On 8 October 2017, he performed at the Merkin Concert Hall at the Kaufman Music Centre in Manhattan. He also opened the Sixth Edition of the Delhi Classical Music Festival in October 2017.  He was also invited to perform at the prestigious US Ravinia Festival, UK Aldeburgh Festival, and the Virée Festival in Montréal, Canada.

Versatility in music
The son and disciple of Imrat Khan, Nishat stands at the threshold of the future of sitar and Indian music with his uniquely invigorating, contemporary approach. He draws on his own musical heritage as well as engages other genres as diverse as Western classical music, jazz, Flamenco and Gregorian chant. His groundbreaking album Meeting of Angels with Gregorian chant Ensemble Gilles Binchois and sitar has become one of the most successful world music albums and a unique collaboration, which was also performed at the Proms in 2008 with the BBC Singers, and subsequently toured around the world with top choirs.
  
He composed the music for the album “Jaan Meri” with singer Anuradha Palakurthi, of which the title track won 2019 Song of the Year, Independent Music Category Award at the prestigious Radio Mirchi Music Awards, the Indian equivalent of the Grammys.

Films
In 2011, he composed his first Bollywood film score, Yeh Saali Zindagi, for the director Sudhir Mishra. In 2013, the Indian Government commissioned him to write a 70-minute orchestral score for the Indian silent film, A Throw of Dice. The work was commissioned especially for performance at the Centenary Film Festival, which celebrates 100 years of Indian cinema.
In addition he has composed music for Ismail Merchant’s Heat and Dust (1983) and Bernardo Bertolucci’s Little Buddha (1993).

Press appearances and interviews
"Nishat Khan's new Sitar Concerto offered an altogether more meditative engagement with India. This sitar legend (just the latest in a dynasty of great musicians in his family) is a familiar face at the Proms, but he has never before appeared as both composer and soloist. The concerto itself follows in the footsteps of Ravi Shankar's concerto, marrying the textures and techniques of Indian classical music with the instrumentation and symphonic structure of western music." — Alexandra Coghlan, The Arts Desk, 13 August 2013

"Nishat Khan himself and the orchestra gave an exemplary account of the concerto. The charismatic presence of Khan on his podium dominated the whole performance and his interactions with the orchestra were fascinating, genuinely touching and exciting by turns." — Chris Garlick, Bachtrack, 14 August 2013

"Khan's playing emerged from and receded into the textures like the mysterious traveller, the sitar was meant to represent. Although his performance cohered exactly with the mood and tempo of the orchestra, it also embodied a sense of autonomy from external constraints, not least by the resonance of its sympathetic strings outlasting all other tones, and by the increasingly virtuosic strumming towards the end, compounding the impression of a source of dynamic energy whose origins are unfathomable." - Curtis Rogers, Classicalsource.com, August 2013

"The main event of the evening was the world premiere of Nishat Khan's The Gate of the Moon. Like Ravi Shankar before him, this Calcutta-born sitar player has been impelled to create a sitar concerto with Western orchestration: with amplification, the two elements can be brought to a sort of parity. Nishat Khan was invited to puff his piece beforehand and did so fulsomely, describing his instrument as 'the unknown traveler introducing a mystical and positive energy'." — Michael Church, The Independent, 13 August 2013

Personal life
He has been touring continuously since the age of 17 and has resided in India, Italy, France, UK and the United States. He was an invited Visiting Professor of Ethnomusicology at the University of California, Los Angeles in 2003 and California State University at Long Beach in 2005.  He has lectured at universities around the world, including College of DuPage, UMass Amherst, UC Santa Cruz, Princeton University, Kent State University, Dartington College of Arts in London, Hochschule der Kunste in Berlin and many other prestigious institutions.  
He has a daughter named Inaya Khan.  He has three brothers who are themselves accomplished musicians, and one sister.

Compositions and albums

See also
Sitar in jazz

References

External links

 
 "The Gate of the Moon" page at his publisher, Faber Music Ltd
 Gaana'''
 Saavn 
 Hungama 
 Wynk MusicArticles
"Nishat Khan review – sitar maestro turns rock guitarist", The Guardian"Nishat Khan: 'Indian music has been spoiled by mediocre people'", The TelegraphKhan at World Music Institute
"Heart to heart with Ustad Nishat Khan", The Asian Age"Darbar Festival 2017: Nishat Khan and the soul of Khayal – Class acts, joyous and magical", Asian Culture Vulture''
BBC Music

1960s births
Etawah gharana
Hindustani instrumentalists
Living people
Musicians from Kolkata
Sitar players
Indian Muslims
University of California, Los Angeles faculty
Indian expatriates in the United States
Hindi film score composers
20th-century Indian musicians